The Men's 10,000 metres at the 2011 World Championships in Athletics was held at the Daegu Stadium on August 28. There were twenty entrants, with nineteen athletes from twelve countries starting the race.

Mo Farah had been undefeated over the distance that year and his European record of 26:46.57 minutes topped the season's rankings. Eritrea's Zersenay Tadese and Ethiopians Imane Merga and Sileshi Sihine were other entrants ranked in the top six. Kenenisa Bekele, the unbeaten world champion since 2003, decided to defend his title, but his form was unknown as injuries had meant that he had not raced since early 2010. Kenya, typically strong in the event, sent a team of 2007 bronze medallist Martin Mathathi, Peter Cheruiyot Kirui, and World Cross Country runner-up Paul Kipngetich Tanui.

Zersenay Tadese set a fast pace for much of the race, a decision which soon reduced the leading pack to the Ethiopian and Kenyan teams, with the additions of the Eritrean, Mo Farah, and Galen Rupp. Kenenisa Bekele dropped out at the halfway point, unable to match the leading pace. The final 500 metres saw Farah take the lead with an injection of speed, with Imane Merga and Ibrahim Jeilan the only runners to follow him. Farah appeared to have judged the race well, having led at the bell for the final 400 m and completing his last lap in 53.36 seconds. However, Ibrahim Jeilan was even faster and overtook Farah in the final metres of the straight, taking the gold by a margin of less than 0.3 seconds. Imane Merga claimed the bronze five seconds later and Zersenay Tadese and Martin Mathathi came fourth and fifth.

Ibrahim Jeilan, the 2006 World Junior Champion, was an unexpected winner and Farah later remarked that he had never heard of him. Having felt overlooked for the Ethiopian team for the 2008 Olympics and 2009 World Championships, Ibrahim had moved to Japan to prepare himself away from the major circuit. It was the fifth consecutive time that an Ethiopian athlete had won the world title. Although Farah was the runner-up, he ran the second fastest time ever by a British athlete and became the country's first ever men's medallist in the event. Imane Merga's bronze was his first ever world medal on the track.

Medalists

Records

Prior to the competition, the following world and championship records were as follows.

Qualification standards

Schedule

Results

Final

References

External links
10,000 metres results at IAAF website

10000
10,000 metres at the World Athletics Championships